Toccoa is a city in far Northeast Georgia near the border with South Carolina. The population was 9,133 as of the 2020 census.

History
Native Americans, including indigenous peoples of the Mississippian culture, and historic Yuchi (linked to the Muscogee Creek confederacy and later allies of the Cherokee), occupied Tugaloo and the area of Toccoa for at least 1,000 years prior to European settlement.

The Mississippian culture was known for building earthen platform mounds; in the Mississippi and Ohio valleys, the people developed some large, dense cities and complexes featuring multiple mounds and, in some cases, thousands of residents. In what is known as the regional South Appalachian Mississippian culture, by contrast, settlements were smaller and the peoples typically built a single platform mound in the larger villages.

Salvage archeological studies were conducted by Dr. Joseph Caldwell of the University of Georgia in 1957, prior to flooding of this area after construction of a dam downriver. He determined the first settlement was founded about 800 CE and lasted to 1700, when the village was burned. By that time, it was occupied by proto-Creek who were descendants of the Mississippians. Colonial maps until the American Revolution identified this village as one of the Hogeloge people (now known as Yuchi). While they later became allies of the Cherokee, they were of a different ethnicity and language group.

Colonial period

Indian agent Col. George Chicken was one of the first English colonists to mention Toccoa in his journal from 1725, calling it Toxsoah.

United States era
European Americans did not settle here until after the American Revolutionary War, when the government gave land grants in lieu of pay owed to veterans. A group led by Col. William H. Wofford moved to the area when the war ended. It became known as Wofford's Tract, or Wofford's Settlement. Col. Wofford is buried near Toccoa Falls. His son, William T. Wofford, was born near Toccoa (then part of Habersham County). 

Travelers had to rely on using fords, and later ferries, to get across the Tugaloo River. The first Prather's Bridge was a swinging bridge built in 1804 by James Jeremiah Prather. The first bridge was washed away during a freshet (an overflow caused by heavy rain).

Georgia conducted a Land Lottery of 1820, although the Cherokee had not yet ceded this area to the United States. Scots-Irish who acquired land in the lottery moved to this area from the backcountry of North Carolina and the Georgia coast. The Georgia Gold Rush, starting in 1828, also attracted many new settlers to North Georgia.

European Americans pressed the government to take over the land of the Five Civilized Tribes, seeking cheaper land to develop for cotton plantations. Short-staple cotton, which could be grown in the uplands through this area, had become profitable since the invention of the cotton gin for processing it. At the urging of President Andrew Jackson, Congress passed the Indian Removal Act of 1830, authorizing the government to force cessions of land by Southeast tribes in exchange for lands west of the Mississippi River, in what became known as Indian Territory (now Oklahoma). The 1838 removal of the Cherokee on the infamous "Trail of Tears" extinguished most of their land claims to this area. The US government released former Cherokee and Creek (Muscogee) lands for sale and settlement by European Americans in Georgia.

Toccoa means "beautiful" in the Cherokee language; it is derived from the Cherokee term for "where the Catawbas lived."

A more substantial bridge was built across the Tugaloo River in 1850. That year James D. Prather supervised the construction of his plantation house known as Riverside, on a hill overlooking the upper Tugalo River. The Greek revival antebellum house was built by his enslaved African-American workers, and the timber for the house was harvested from his plantation. The Prather family cemetery was developed to the right of the house.

During the Civil War, General Robert Toombs, a close friend of Prather, used this house as a refuge from Union troops. The soldiers pursued him to Riverside, but he hid and escaped capture.

The Prather Bridge was burned in 1863 by Confederate troops during the Civil War to keep the Union enemy from crossing. James Jeremiah Prather and his son, James Devereaux Prather, rebuilt the bridge in 1868. This bridge lasted until 1918, when it was washed away. It was rebuilt in 1920 by James D. Prather. It was afterward replaced by a concrete bridge, but the wooden bridge was kept as a landmark. Vandals burned it down in 1978.

According to historical accounts, the Johns House, a Victorian cottage near Prather Bridge Road, was built in 1898. When the Georgia General Assembly created Stephens County in 1905, Toccoa was established as the county seat.

President Franklin Delano Roosevelt visited Toccoa on March 23, 1938 during the Great Depression. Roosevelt's train made a brief stop there, and he made remarks from the rear platform of the presidential train. He traveled to Gainesville to deliver a major speech, and finished at Warm Springs for a vacation.

Camp Toccoa was developed nearby as a World War II paratrooper training base. It was the first training base for the 506th Parachute Infantry Regiment of the Army's 101st Airborne Division. Its Easy Company was subject of the non-fiction book and an HBO miniseries adaptation of the same name: Band of Brothers.

Traveler's Rest, an antebellum 19th-century inn, known locally as Jarrett Manor, is located outside Toccoa. It stands near Lake Hartwell, which was creating by flooding an area of the Tugaloo River after completion of the Hartwell Dam in 1962. The inn has been designated as a National Historic Landmark.

Toccoa Falls is located on the campus of Toccoa Falls College. The short 100-yard path to the base of the 186-foot (57 m) high natural waterfall is handicap accessible.

Geography and climate
Toccoa is located at  (34.574725, −83.319865).

Altitude is 313 m (1,027 ft).

Toccoa has a humid subtropical climate similar to much of the rest of the state of Georgia.

Demographics

2020 census

As of the 2020 United States Census, there were 9,133 people, 3,359 households, and 2,135 families residing in the city.

2010 census
As of the census of 2010, Toccoa had a total population of 8,491. The 2014 population estimate (as of July 1, 2014) was 8,257. The median age of a Toccoa resident is 35.4.  The number of companies in Toccoa is 1,135. In educational attainment, high school graduate or higher percentage was 84.1%. The total housing units in Toccoa is 4,009. The median household income was $34,047. The foreign-born population was 213. The percentage of individuals below poverty level was 24.4%.

Economy
Stephens County Development Authority (SCDA) was established in 1965 to continue and sustain the growth of Northeast Georgia. SCDA is responsible for the recruitment of new businesses such as industrial, manufacturing, distribution, corporate and regional headquarters and customer service centers. SCDA serves the following cities: Toccoa, Eastanollee, Martin, and Avalon.
Major industrial parks in the area are Toccoa Industrial Park, Meadowbrook Industrial Park, and Hayestone Brady Business Park.

The top Stephens County employers in descending order are the Stephens County School System, Caterpillar, Patterson Pump, ASI (GEM Industries), American Woodmark Corp., Standard Register, Sage Automotive Interiors, Habersham Plantation, Toccoa Falls College, Coats & Clark, Eaton Corporation, and PTL Company (an elevator fixtures and parts manufacturer). Founded and headquartered in Toccoa, 1st Franklin Financial Corporation is a regional financial services company with more than 1,300 employees.

Arts and culture

Annual events 
Annual events include the Currahee Military Weekend, the Ida Cox Music Series, Taste of Toccoa, Summer Movies at the Ritz, Costume Parade, Harvest Festival, ChristmasFest, and Christmas Parade.

Music 
Toccoa is the center of a thriving music scene and the home of a regional orchestra. The Toccoa Symphony Orchestra is made up of volunteer musicians from the surrounding community, in South Carolina, and Georgia. The symphony exists to provide quality symphonic music to the region and to bring together musicians from throughout northeast Georgia.

The symphony was founded in 1977 by Pinkie Craft Ware and Archie Sharretts, both music educators. Since its founding, the symphony has performed at least three concerts every season. It is supported by a board of directors and an extensive network of patrons.

The orchestra collaborates with many musicians and provides a wide range of concert experiences. The ensemble has premiered works by young composers, presents a yearly Christmas concert with a one hundred voice choir, and incorporates budding performers from nearby Toccoa Falls College.

Miles Through Time Automotive Museum
The Miles Through Time Automotive Museum was a co-op style automotive museum in a restored 1939 dealership but has moved to Clarkesville, GA in Habersham County.  There are over 100 years of automotive history on display. Vehicles can be stored, listed on consignment, for sale by owner or donated and everything is displayed as museum exhibits.

Currahee Military Museum

The Currahee Military Museum, located in downtown Toccoa at the original train station where arriving GIs would disembark, is dedicated to the paratroopers of World War II who trained at Camp Toccoa. Camp Toccoa was located just outside the city proper, at the foot of Currahee Mountain, and was formerly known as Camp Toombs. The museum houses the original Aldbourne stables where paratroopers of the 101st Airborne Division were housed temporarily in England in 1944. Only one building remains of the original Camp Toccoa (the building is believed to be a former food supply storage facility, based on its position near the former camp's gates and the foundation's construction), and it was donated to the museum in 2011 by the Milliken company, which was using it as a machine shop. The museum intends to restore the building, along with the surrounding grounds.

Annual Currahee Challenge
On the first Saturday of every October, a six-mile race is held along the Colonel Sink Trail, the same trail used by the paratroopers as part of their training for combat. Known as one of the most daunting races in America, the common refrain is "Three Miles Up And Three Miles Down."  The race is part of the Currahee Military Weekend, which features World War II military reenactments in a staged military camp, weapons demonstrations, book signings by veterans, a parade through the downtown historic district, a hangar dance at the airport, and a special banquet featuring keynote speakers and veterans.

Ritz Theatre
The Ritz Theatre is a restored 1939 art deco movie theater, located in the Downtown Toccoa Historic District at 139 Doyle Street. It is an active venue for a variety of entertainment.

Other points of interest
Local lore includes the Hanging Tree, located on the western side of the Stephens County Courthouse.  The actual tree used for the executions is now just a stump on the courthouse lawn, the tree having been removed in 2011.  On June 14, 1915 Sam Stephens was taken from the Stephens County Jail and lynched by a mob of 100 armed men.

The clock at the spire of the courthouse was restored to operational condition in 2010 as part of an overall renovation of the building, and is the highlight of the historic district which features several buildings from the American Civil War period. 

The Toccoa Casket Company, now out of business, was the largest supplier of caskets to the military until Vietnam. Its building, located on the main road leading into Toccoa from the south, on the route from Toccoa to Currahee Mountain, was razed in 2014. 

Toccoa also has a thriving classic car culture, as evidenced by frequent car shows. In addition, classic cars from the late 1920s through the 1970s can easily be spotted on the roads and in parking lots. 

"Born from fire, and twice rebuilt from ashes, Downtown Toccoa's Albemarle Hotel has witnessed Toccoa's growth, and its struggles, for more than 100 years." The current building, dating from the 1930s, retains some of the previous structure. For many years, it was known as the Alexander Apartments. The hotel is located in the Downtown Toccoa Historic District, and is on the National Register of Historic Places.

Education

Stephens County Schools 
Stephens County Schools serves students in preschool through grade twelve. There are four elementary schools, a middle school, and a high school. The district has 304 full-time teachers and over 4,405 students.

Schools
Stephens County High School (SCHS) (grades 9–12)
Stephens County Fifth Grade Academy (at SCMS) (grade 5)
Stephens County Middle School (SCMS) (grades 6–8)
Liberty Elementary (grades 1-2)
Toccoa Elementary (grades 3-4)
Big A Elementary (grades Pre K-K)

Stephens County High School finished building its new facility in the spring of 2012. It includes a four-sided gymnasium arena, better fine arts facilities, and a larger media center.

Crossroads Juvenile Academy is an alternative school in Stephens County, that gives behaviorally impaired students a second chance.

Mountain Education Center is an online night school that grants full Georgia high school diplomas. This course is designed not only for full-time students but also part-time students who are working to recover lost credits.

Higher education
Toccoa is the home of Toccoa Falls College, a private Christian college. North Georgia Technical College has a campus (the Currahee campus) just south of Toccoa.

Infrastructure

Transportation
Amtrak's Crescent connects Toccoa with the cities of New York, Philadelphia, Baltimore, Washington, Charlotte, Atlanta, Birmingham, and New Orleans. The Amtrak station is at 47 North Alexander Street. The picture to the left is how the station appeared before the extension of the Currahee Military Museum, which was built to house the Aldebourne Stables and a growing collection of artifacts.  That extension was enlarged in 2009 to include a community room and gift shop. The Amtrak line is shared with the Norfolk Southern Railway. Before Amtrak, Toccoa was a stop on the Airline Belle, a regional train of the Southern Railway from 1879 to 1931.

Toccoa is also home to the Toccoa Airport, a small executive airport to the northeast of town. The airport was built by R.G. LeTourneau and is sometimes referred to as R.G. LeTourneau Field.

The nearest interstate highway is Interstate 85. State highway 17 bypasses Toccoa, and highway 17 Alt runs through Toccoa. US highway 123/state highway 365 runs through Toccoa as well.

Historic Town Mall

Downtown Toccoa is located near the courthouse and the train depot, which connects to Atlanta. From the 1950s through 1980s, business bustled in this "mall." Each day people would flood to shop in downtown Toccoa. Several national retail outlets were then located in downtown Toccoa, including the Belk Gallant department store.

In the early 1960s, around the country, local downtown businesses faced competition with large shopping malls, and many began to fail.  As an answer to the depressed conditions in downtowns, Toccoa and many other towns erected concrete canopies and closed streets to create a pedestrian mall. In less than ten years it was evident that instead of enhancing businesses and creating a positive downtown image, these canopies actually accelerated the downtown's decline.

When the Belk Gallant department store announced it was going to move along a four lane road called Big A, community leaders organized Main Street Toccoa in 1990. In 1991, the Georgia Department of Community Affairs Resource Team recommended that the canopies be removed and that the street be opened once again to vehicular traffic. However, for many years the project was not supported.

During that time, Main Street Toccoa implemented many changes and improvements to the downtown mall area. Brick pavers were installed and trees were planted. However, the canopies themselves began to deteriorate, and no support was found to repair them. During this time, businesses continued to flounder and many of the buildings were empty and in disrepair.

Over time, however, with growing support, approval was given to start the canopy removal project. Efforts that helped contribute community support for the project included county-wide public surveys, a University of Georgia market study, a UGA design charrette, and renderings of individual buildings without the canopies provided by the GA Trust for Historic Preservation and UGA Community Design Planning and Preservation. To gather the necessary funds for the project, Toccoa partnered with six state agencies (Appalachian Regional Commission, Georgia Department of Community Affairs, One Georgia Authority, United States Department of Agriculture, and Georgia Department of Transportation) that provided $1.3 million, with additional local funding of $552,000.

During the canopy removal and street re-opening project, private interest in downtown increased. In 2008, downtown saw 33 storefronts renovated (under the guidance of the Georgia Mountains Regional Development Center Historic Preservation Planner), 11 new business, 17 new jobs, 28 part-time jobs and 68 full-time equivalent jobs retained, and private investment of $3.5 million. Toccoa's Main Street was re-opened to vehicular traffic.

The Currahee Military Museum, featured recently in the PBS series GA Traveler, and named as one of the best museums along the East Coast by Blue Ridge Mountain Magazine, is another attraction that continues downtown's resurgence. Located in the restored historic train depot, the museum features a massive exhibit of 506's Easy Company memorabilia. This World War II paratrooper company was popularized by the HBO miniseries Band of Brothers. The depot housing this museum was recently restored to its pre-1940s appearance.  The depot building had previously been used as a maintenance and storage area for Norfolk Southern. Now it has been transformed to a publicly owned building that is home to the Chamber, Welcome Center, Stephens County Historical Society Museum, the Currahee Military Museum, and Amtrak. Funding for the million dollar project was received through Transportation Enhancement Activity and GDOT funds of $400,000; local funding of $100,000 and private investment funds of over $500,000 were contributed. The museum just completed its second addition, funded by Special Purpose Local Option Sales Tax (SPLOST).

Enhancing Toccoa as a Northeast Georgia destination is the newly restored courthouse, which anchors the downtown district. The renovation project was overseen by a governmental appointed citizen authority.  Funded entirely by SPLOST dollars, the $2 million renovation project brought a historic 1907 building back to life while adding green space to the historic district and retained government offices and downtown customers in the city's square.

Sister Cities
Toccoa has no active sister city program. In the 1970s, a sister city relationship was established with Meßstetten, Germany, but the relationship has not been renewed.

Notable people
The following list includes notable people who were born or have lived in Toccoa. 
 Paul Anderson (1932–1994) – 1955 World weightlifting champion, 1956 gold medal winner in Olympic weightlifting; resident of Toccoa
 Howard "Doc" Ayers (1922-2020) - football coach at the University of Georgia
 Dan Biggers (1931–2011) – actor
 James Brown (1933–2006) – singer, songwriter, dancer, and bandleader
 Bobby Byrd (1934–2007) – musician, songwriter, and record producer
 Dee Clark (1938–1990) – singer
 McKenzie Coan (born 1996) - swimmer and 2016 gold medal winner in the 2016 Summer Paralympics
 Ida Cox (1896–1967) – blues singer and vaudeville performer
 Dale Davis (born 1969) – former professional basketball player
 The Famous Flames - R & B group
 DeForest Kelley (1920–1999) – actor
 R. G. LeTourneau (1888-1969) – inventor and Christian philanthropist
 Herb Maffett (1907-1994) - All-American football player at the University of Georgia
 Ethan Martin (born 1989) – professional baseball player
 Evan Oglesby (born 1981) – professional football player
 Tauren Poole (born 1989) - professional football player
 Ralph E. Reed Jr. (born 1961) – political activist
 Oral Roberts (1918–2009) – pastor and televangelist
 Kimberly Schlapman (born 1969) – member of the country music band Little Big Town
 Ramblin' Tommy Scott (1917-2013) - country and rockabilly musician
 Billy Shaw (born 1938) – former Georgia Tech and NFL football player; Pro Football Hall of Fame member
 Aaron Shust (born 1975) – Christian singer and three time Dove Award winner
 Jerry Kenneth "Ken" Swilling (born 1970) – football player and a safety on the Georgia Tech 1990 National Championship Team
 Pat Swilling (born 1964) – professional football player and politician
 The Watkins Family - Southern gospel/bluegrass music performers
 William T. Wofford (1824-1884) - Civil War general

In literature and film
The novel Fireworks Over Toccoa by Jeffrey Stepakoff was published by St. Martin's Press and released nationwide on March 30, 2010. A day-long celebration was held in Toccoa culminating in a fireworks display at Boyd Field in the evening.

Several films have been shot in Toccoa:

 County Line (2017) - starring Tom Wopat, Jeff Fahey, and Grant Goodeve
 Heritage Falls (2016) - starring David Keith
 Legal Action (2018) - starring Eric Close, Nick Searcy, and Tommy Flanagan
 The Legend of Five Mile Cave (2018) - starring Adam Baldwin and Jeremy Sumpter
 Southern Comfort (2001) - documentary about resident trans man Robert Eads
 The Warrant (2019) - starring Neal McDonough, Steven R. McQueen, Casper Van Dien, and Annabeth Gish
 When We Last Spoke (2018) - starring Cloris Leachman, Corbin Bernsen, and Melissa Gilbert

In media
The Weather Channel remembered the 1977 Toccoa Falls dam break and flood.

The rock band Luxury was formed in Toccoa in the early 1990s.

On May 7, 2000, Mary Ann Stephens of Toccoa was shot to death outside a Ramada Inn in Jacksonville, Florida while on vacation with her husband. The incident received national attention and resulted in an Academy Award-winning French documentary, Murder on a Sunday Morning, on the arrest and acquittal of the original suspect.

Awards

 2008 Excellence in Downtown Development Award from the Georgia Downtown Association
 2009 Great America Main Street Top Ten Semi-finalist from the National Trust for Historic Preservation
 2009 Excellence in Rehabilitation Award from the Georgia Trust for Historic Preservation
 2014 and again in 2021 Georgia Exceptional Main Street (GEMS) Community designation from the Georgia Department of Community Affairs, the highest designation awarded in the state
 2017 Chairman's Award for Excellence in Historic Rehabilitation from the Georgia Trust for Historic Preservation
 2018 Downtown Excellence Award in Promotions from the Georgia Downtown Association
 2018 Community Grand Award from the Georgia Urban Forest Council
 2019 Live, Work, Play Community award from GeorgiaTrend and the Georgia Municipal Association

Kelly Barnes Dam failure

On November 6, 1977, the earthen Kelly Barnes Dam failed and released over 170 million gallons of water above the Toccoa Falls College campus. The failure killed 20 children and 19 adults.
 First Lady Rosalynn Carter visited Toccoa the next day.

References

External links
 
  of the City of Toccoa
 Main Street Toccoa website
 The 1977 Toccoa Flood Report of Failure of Kelly Barnes Dam Flood and Findings from the USGS
 Photograph of downtown Toccoa, 1941 from Kenneth Rogers Photographs, Atlanta History Center
 Toccoa's Historic Ritz Theatre

Cities in Georgia (U.S. state)
Cities in Stephens County, Georgia
County seats in Georgia (U.S. state)